Khaleeji Commercial Bank BSC (KHCB) is an Islamic bank, headquartered in the Kingdom of Bahrain, and operating under a Retail Islamic Banking license granted by the Central Bank of Bahrain (CBB). It is a Public Bahraini Shareholding Company listed on the Bahrain Stock Exchange. KHCB offers a range of banking and Investment products and services to high-net-worth individuals, corporate entities, and financial institutions. These include commercial and corporate banking, wealth management, structured investment products and project financing facilities.

KHCB offers its services to high-net-worth individuals, corporates and financial institutions. In addition, the Bank actively provides financing for property developers, landowners and property investors.

Background
Established in November 2004 as Gulf Finance House Commercial Bank with a paid-up capital of BD 30 million, Khaleeji Commercial Bank is a niche Islamic private bank, headquartered in the Kingdom of Bahrain and operating under a commercial banking licence granted by the Bahrain Monetary Agency.
As a wholly owned subsidiary of Gulf Finance House, Khaleeji Commercial Bank offers its services to high-net-worth individuals and financial institutions in Bahrain. In
addition, it provides financing for property developers, landowners and property investors across the Middle East.

Products and services
The Bank offers three main product areas:

Unrestricted Investments
These are short-term investments of different maturities, designed to attract short term funds while offering higher
yields.

Restricted Investments
These are investment funds with property as an underlying asset. Different funds will be structured with varying
property portfolios.

Financing products
These comprise Murabaha and Ijara financing for commercial and residential properties.

In addition, the Bank focuses on financing activities in real estate, both in Bahrain and around the region. Main financing
product and service offerings include:

Developer bridge financing
This is typically up to 24 months’ duration.

Commercial property financing
This is typically up to 7 years’ duration.

Residential property financing
The Bank assists individuals in financing residential properties. Typically, these properties are associated with the investment funds managed by the Gulf Finance House Group.

Advisory services
The Bank’s property team offers a range of advisory services to assist clients in property development. These include project conceptualisation, deal structuring and arranging finance.

Projects
Bahrain Financial Harbour (BFH)
Through the US$134 million Al Marfa’a Al Mali Sukuk, Khaleeji Commercial Bank supported the first construction phase of US$1.3 billion Bahrain Financial Harbour (BFH), one of the most visionary projects undertaken by Gulf Finance House. Conceived as a landmark financial city, BFH is the first development of its kind in the Middle East, covering an area of over two million square feet reclaimed from the sea. BFH comprises several parcels of development with the first, currently under construction,
being the Financial Centre at the heart of the development. The development is attracting foreign direct investment to Bahrain and reinforcing the country’s position as the financial capital of the Middle East.

Oryx Hills
This major offering from Khaleeji Commercial Bank is a private residential community that forms part of the US$750 million Al Areen development project in the Kingdom of Bahrain. Covering an area of 140,000 square metres, this development comprises luxury villas set amidst natural surroundings. To date, the Bank has successfully sold over 70 per cent of the villas at Oryx Hills.

Royal University for Women
The Royal University for Women (RUW) is the first private, purpose-built, international university in the Gulf dedicated solely to educating women. In 2005, Khaleeji Commercial Bank entered into a strategic partnership with Emirates Islamic Bank, Amlak Finance, and the Islamic Corporation for the Development of the Private Sector, to provide Musharaka financing for the construction of the University campus.

The Royal Metropolis
The Bank was appointed as lead financier for the US$1 billion-plus Royal Metropolis project in the Hashemite Kingdom of Jordan. The development of the project is being undertaken in phases, starting with Jordan Gate and Royal Village in Ammam, followed by the Royal Resort and Spa on the shores of the Dead Sea. Khaleeji Commercial Bank has signed a memorandum of understanding with Jordinvest, one of Jordan’s leading financial institutions, to assist with arranging and structuring project finance.

Al Wafer Account
On 11 July 2009, KHCB announced the launch of the Al Waffer Account, its newest commercial banking product offered to the market. The Al Waffer is a Sharia compliant Mudarabah account offering participants total cash prizes of one million dollars every year. Participants will get one point for every BD50 in their account for the raffle, with a minimum of BD100.

See also

List of banks in Bahrain

References

External links

Official site
Google Finance Entry
Financials

2004 establishments in Bahrain
Banks established in 2004
Banks of Bahrain
Companies listed on the Bahrain Bourse
Companies based in Manama